John Calvin MacKay (1891–1986) was a Free Church of Scotland minister who served as Moderator of the General Assembly in 1942.

Life

He studied at Edinburgh University graduating MA in 1912.

From 1921 to 1937 he worked as a missionary in Cajamarca in Peru. On his return to Scotland he was ordained at the joint parishes of Kincardine and Croick in Sutherland. In May 1942 he was elected Moderator of the General Assembly.

He died at Inverness on 21 September 1986 and was buried with his wife in the churchyard of Kingussie Parish Church.

Family

He married Mary Rachel MacKenzie Munro (1889-1967). Their son Angus David Hope Mackay died whilst a child.

Publications

The Threefold Secret of the Living Church (1942)

References

1891 births
1986 deaths
Alumni of the University of Edinburgh
20th-century Ministers of the Free Church of Scotland
Scottish Presbyterian missionaries
Presbyterian missionaries in Peru